3-Iodothyronamine (T1AM) is an endogenous thyronamine. T1AM is a high-affinity ligand for the trace amine-associated receptor TAAR1 (TAR1, TA1), a recently discovered G protein-coupled receptor. T1AM is the most potent endogenous TAAR1 agonist yet discovered. Activation of TAAR1 by T1AM results in the production of large amounts of cAMP. This effect is coupled with decreased body temperature and cardiac output. Wu et al. have pointed out that this relationship is not typical of the endocrine system, indicating that TAAR1 activity may not be coupled to G-proteins in some tissues, or that T1AM may interact with other receptor subtypes.

T1AM may be part of a signaling pathway to modulate cardiac function, as the compound can induce negative inotropic effects and decrease cardiac output.

See also
 O-Phenyl-3-iodotyramine
 Trace amine

References

External links
 

Biogenic amines
Iodinated tyrosine derivatives
Phenol ethers
Phenethylamines
Thyroid
TAAR1 agonists
Trace amines